Area code 573 is a telephone area code in the North American Numbering Plan (NANP) for most of the eastern half of the U.S. state of Missouri outside the immediate St. Louis area, including the state capital of Jefferson City, as well as Columbia, Cape Girardeau, Hannibal, Rolla, and Sikeston. The numbering plan area (NPA) extends across half of the width of the state, with the northeastern tip near the northeastern corner of the state, the Lake of the Ozarks at the western tip and Doniphan as the southwestern tip.  It also serves all of southeastern Missouri (including the Missouri Bootheel area) and areas adjacent to the Mississippi River. The area code was created on January 7, 1996, in a split of area code 314, which was reduced to the St. Louis metropolitan area in Missouri. The largest cities in area code 573 are Columbia, home to the University of Missouri, and Jefferson City, the state capital.

History
When the American Telephone and Telegraph Company (AT&T) created a universal North American telephone numbering plan for Operator Toll Dialing in 1947, Missouri was divided into two numbering plan areas (NPAs), which received the area codes 314 and 816. Area code 314 identified the eastern part of the state, from the northeast corner of the state at the Illinois border along a southwestern line near Columbia and Jefferson City to the center of the state, and continuing southeast into the east side of the West Plains area to the Arkansas state line. The largest city of the area code was St. Louis on the Mississippi river in the east.

By 1995, the telephone subscriber base experience substantial growth, threatening the exhaustion of the numbering pool. Relief planning entailed the division of the numbering plan area to create a new area code, 573, for most areas outside of the St. Louis metropolitan area, which would retained area code 314. The area code split became effective at day end of January 7, 1996, with a permissive dialing period commencing until July 7, 1996, during which the new numbering plan area could be dialed with both area codes.

On May 1, 2022, the Missouri Public Service Commission (MPSC) approved an all-services distributed overlay plan for the 573 service area.
On June 17, 2022, the NANP Administrator assigned area code 235 for the relief action, beginning with a permissive dialing period of six months on August 26, 2023.

Service area
Major Cities

Columbia
Cape Girardeau
Farmington
Hannibal
Jefferson City
Rolla
Poplar Bluff
Sikeston

Other Cities

Camdenton
Centralia
Dexter
Fulton
Hermann
Jackson
Mexico
St. James
Sullivan
Waynesville

References

External links

573
573
Telecommunications-related introductions in 1996
1996 establishments in Missouri